Hakea invaginata is a shrub in the family  Proteacea and is endemic to Western Australia. It has purplish-pink flowers, smooth needle-shaped leaves and the branchlets are thickly covered in hairs.

Description
The branchlets are densely covered in fine matted hairs. The terete evergreen leaves have five deep narrow grooves running through the entirety of their length. It blooms from June to September and produces pink-purple flowers. Each solitary axillary inflorescence has an umbelliform raceme and is grouped to form a long brush-like structure containing 60 to 80 flowers along the axil. The perianth is most often pink and less often is white. Following flowering one to six stalked fruits will form per axil. The light to dark brown seeds within have blackish patches.

Taxonomy
Hakea invaginata  was first formally described by the botanist Brian Burtt in 1950 as part of the work Hooker's Icones Plantarum. Known synonyms are Hakea invaginata var. invaginata, Hakea sulcata var. intermedia and Hakea invaginata var. pachycarpa.

The specific epithet is taken from the Latin word invaginatus meaning enclose or fold in, referring to the longitudinally grooved leaves.

Distribution
It is endemic to an area in the Wheatbelt and Mid West regions of Western Australia from around Northampton in the north west to Mount Magnet in the northeast to around Merredin in the south and grows in sandy, loamy or gravelly soils. It is often found on sandplains where it is part of shrubland communities that are dominated by species of Acacia or Melaleuca.

References

invaginata
Eudicots of Western Australia
Plants described in 1950